Fisher's Lane Bridge is a historic stone arch bridge that carries Fisher's Lane west of Ramona Avenue across Tacony Creek in Tacony Creek Park in Philadelphia, Pennsylvania.

It is currently open to traffic.

Though claimed by some to have been re-built in 1796, a still-legible cornerstone in the bridge masonry shows the year 1759.

References

External links
Listing at BridgeHunter.com

Bridges completed in 1796
Bridges in Philadelphia
Road bridges in Pennsylvania
Stone arch bridges in the United States